Karapürçek can refer to:

 Karapürçek
 Karapürçek, Kargı
 Karapürçek, Taşköprü